The Adventures of Mark Twain is the title of two films:

The Adventures of Mark Twain (1944 film), starring Fredric March as Twain
The Adventures of Mark Twain (1985 film), a stop motion animated film